RNA recognition motif, RNP-1 is a putative RNA-binding domain of about 90 amino acids that are known to bind single-stranded RNAs. It was found in many eukaryotic proteins.

The largest group of single strand RNA-binding protein is the eukaryotic RNA recognition motif (RRM) family that contains an eight amino acid RNP-1 consensus sequence.

RRM proteins have a variety of RNA binding preferences and functions, and include heterogeneous nuclear ribonucleoproteins (hnRNPs), proteins implicated in regulation of alternative splicing (SR, U2AF2, Sxl), protein components of small nuclear ribonucleoproteins (U1 and U2 snRNPs), and proteins that regulate RNA stability and translation (PABP, La, Hu). The RRM in heterodimeric splicing factor U2 snRNP auxiliary factor appears to have two RRM-like domains with specialised features for protein recognition. The motif also appears in a few single stranded DNA binding proteins.

The typical RRM consists of four anti-parallel beta-strands and two alpha-helices arranged in a beta-alpha-beta-beta-alpha-beta fold with side chains that stack with RNA bases.  A third helix is present during RNA binding in some cases. The RRM is reviewed in a number of publications.

Human proteins containing this domain
A2BP1;     ACF;       BOLL;      BRUNOL4;   BRUNOL5;   BRUNOL6;   CCBL2;     CGI-96;    
CIRBP;     CNOT4;     CPEB2;     CPEB3;     CPEB4;     CPSF7;     CSTF2;     CSTF2T;    
CUGBP1;    CUGBP2;    D10S102;   DAZ1;      DAZ2;      DAZ3;      DAZ4;      DAZAP1;    
DAZL;      DNAJC17;   DND1;      EIF3S4;    EIF3S9;    EIF4B;     EIF4H;     ELAVL1;    
ELAVL2;    ELAVL3;    ELAVL4;    ENOX1;     ENOX2;     EWSR1;     FUS;       FUSIP1;    
G3BP;      G3BP1;     G3BP2;     GRSF1;     HNRNPL;    HNRPA0;    HNRPA1;    HNRPA2B1;  
HNRPA3;    HNRPAB;    HNRPC;     HNRPCL1;   HNRPD;     HNRPDL;    HNRPF;     HNRPH1;    
HNRPH2;    HNRPH3;    HNRPL;     HNRPLL;    HNRPM;     HNRPR;     HRNBP1;    HSU53209;  
HTATSF1;   IGF2BP1;   IGF2BP2;   IGF2BP3;   LARP7; MKI67IP;   MSI1;      MSI2;      MSSP-2;    
MTHFSD;    MYEF2;     NCBP2;     NCL;       NOL8;      NONO;      P14;       
PABPC1;    PABPC1L;   PABPC3;    PABPC4;    PABPC5;    PABPN1;    POLDIP3;   PPARGC1;   
PPARGC1A;  PPARGC1B;  PPIE;      PPIL4;     PPRC1;     PSPC1;     PTBP1;     PTBP2;     
PUF60;     RALY;      RALYL;     RAVER1;    RAVER2;    RBM10;     RBM11;     RBM12;     
RBM12B;    RBM14;     RBM15;     RBM15B;    RBM16;     RBM17;     RBM18;     RBM19;     
RBM22;     RBM23;     RBM24;     RBM25;     RBM26;     RBM27;     RBM28;     RBM3;      
RBM32B;    RBM33;     RBM34;     RBM35A;    RBM35B;    RBM38;     RBM39;     RBM4;      
RBM41;     RBM42;     RBM44;     RBM45;     RBM46;     RBM47;     RBM4B;     RBM5;      
RBM7;      RBM8A;     RBM9;      RBMS1;     RBMS2;     RBMS3;     RBMX;      RBMX2;     
RBMXL2;    RBMY1A1;   RBMY1B;    RBMY1E;    RBMY1F;    RBMY2FP;   RBPMS;     RBPMS2;    
RDBP;      RNPC3;     RNPC4;     RNPS1;     ROD1;      SAFB;      SAFB2;     SART3;     
SETD1A;    SF3B14;    SF3B4;     SFPQ;      SFRS1;     SFRS10;    SFRS11;    SFRS12;    
SFRS15;    SFRS2;     SFRS2B;    SFRS3;     SFRS4;     SFRS5;     SFRS6;     SFRS7;     
SFRS9;     SLIRP;     SLTM;      SNRP70;    SNRPA;     SNRPB2;    SPEN;      SR140;     
SRRP35;    SSB;       SYNCRIP;   TAF15;     TARDBP;    THOC4;     TIA1;      TIAL1;     
TNRC4;     TNRC6C;    TRA2A;     TRSPAP1;   TUT1;      U1SNRNPBP; U2AF1;     U2AF2;     
UHMK1;     ZCRB1;     ZNF638;    ZRSR1;     ZRSR2;

References

External links

Protein domains